Cristian Rolando Ledesma Núñez (born 11 February 1987) is a Paraguayan football striker currently playing for Deportivo Quito in Ecuador.

After scoring 10 goals in 19 games for Club Olimpia in the Paraguayan first division Apertura tournament he was signed by Independiente and moved to Argentina during the summer of 2007.

Ledesma suffered a cruciate knee ligament injury at the start of the Apertura, delaying his first team debut and in January 2009 he returned to Olimpia.

References
 Argentine Primera statistics
Ledesma joins Independiente
Short Profile

1987 births
Living people
Paraguayan footballers
Paraguayan expatriate footballers
Club Olimpia footballers
Sportivo Luqueño players
Club Atlético Independiente footballers
Naval de Talcahuano footballers
Coquimbo Unido footballers
Cobresal footballers
Primera B de Chile players
Chilean Primera División players
Argentine Primera División players
Expatriate footballers in Chile
Expatriate footballers in Argentina
Association football forwards